Photographs & Memories: His Greatest Hits is the first greatest hits album by American singer-songwriter Jim Croce, released on September 26, 1974, by ABC Records. The album was Croce's second posthumous release following his 1973 death in an airplane crash. 

The inner photo jacket includes a tributatory essay on one side and a photo of Jim's son Adrian James (A.J.) on the other.  The title track originally appeared on the You Don't Mess Around with Jim LP as well as the B-side of the album title track single in 1972. The album has since been reissued on Vinyl in 2020 by BMG.

Critical reception

In a 1974 review in Billboard magazine, the editors wrote, "It is hard to believe one man poured out a fountain of excellent work in barely two years, but this LP offers proof of the greatness of Croce's career and is, in all respects, truly a greatest hits album. They're all worthwhile and this magnificent collection makes one realize just how greatly this man will be missed. The beauty of music, however, is that he will always be heard."

Track listing

Chart and certifications

Weekly charts

Year-end charts

Certifications

References

Jim Croce albums
Compilation albums published posthumously
1974 greatest hits albums
ABC Records compilation albums